Ramuan is an Indonesian-Malay term referring to a blend of ingredients (e.g. plants or plant organs) selected to provide health benefits in the preparation of food or the creation of herbal medicines.

Ramuan is mostly a holistic formulation of mixed leaves, stems, barks, fruits and roots, traditionally gathered from the rainforest. Generally, ramu or ramuan is considered capable of enhancing beauty or promoting health. Ramuan blends are used as seasoning for cooking.

In traditional Malay, ber-ramu means to collect or to look for leaves, fruits and roots for medicinal ingredients. Another commonly used term is rempah ratus (a term to denote a polyherbal preparation which requires hundreds of medicinal plants and spices).

In a broader context, the term ramuan is almost interchangeable with the idea of "mixture". However, it further encompasses the sense of ingredient harmonization; it implies a 'melting pot', of unity and integration as well as the sense of 'many held together within unity'.

History
Today, the concept of ramuan is considered most significant in its application to holistic herbal health and beauty preparations. Indigenous people of Indonesia experimented with this wealth of herbal resources, creating and testing the effects of various blends of botanical components. Over thousands of years of experimentation, certain ramuans became favored for their healing, restorative, or beauty promoting effects. These were incorporated into everyday life through practice or ritual, often taking on strong cultural meanings within native traditions. Examples include preparations to aid with pregnancy, childbirth and recovery from childbirth, along with men's preparations designed to improve virility and vitality. Further examples expand into nearly all aspects of daily life, including Malaysia's spa culture, with preparations designed to tone the skin and enhance overall beauty.

The geographic location of the Dutch East Indies has also influenced its holistic herbal practices. The unique placements of its lands, with broad coastlines, has invited many explorers and settlers from surrounding areas. Consequently, the various cultures and people who traded, settled and inter-married in the region have contributed to the traditions of Malay world countries. Settlers from India and China in particular brought their own traditions developed by Indian ayurvedics and Chinese herbalists, which were incorporated with native wisdom and experimentation, while being expanded by the extensive rainforest resources offering new herbal materials. This cross-pollination of herbal cultures has become its own kind of "ramuan", blending the various holistic health and beauty practices into a single culture.

Health and beauty
The notion that outer beauty is a reflection of inner health has passed through many generations of Malay women; in addition, men concern themselves with their health and well-being throughout life; the belief in inner and outer wellness as a totality is eminent in the Malay culture.

Malay women
As the approach to adulthood becomes apparent in a young Malay girl's life, she receives a wealth of herbal health knowledge, from facial and skin care to herbal remedies. Malays believe the face is a reflection of the whole body. A radiant facial complexion is believed to be an indication of a well-balanced mind, body and spirit. Dark circles under the eyes, puffiness, blemishes, dryness and wrinkles reflect an imbalance within the wider body system. Malays believe that internal uncleanliness has direct outer consequences; therefore, a weekly herbal brew of leaves and herbs such as senna leaves (Cassia angustifolia), betel leaves (Piper betle), ginger (Zingiber officinale), sepang (Caesalpinia sappan) and other ingredients is often used for internal cleansing in order to detoxify the body, remove fat and purify the blood, with the goal of promoting a beautiful, youthful complexion.

Malay women also use the readily available Kacip fatima (Labisia pumila) and Akar Serapat (Parameria polyneura). These herbs have been used for centuries to firm vaginal muscles and strengthen the uterus, as well as assisting before and after pregnancy. Kacip Fatima is also sought after for a variety of health benefits, from alleviating fatigue to promoting hormonal balance and emotional well-being.

Men's health
Traditionally, the rituals of Malay men are geared toward masculine strength and wellness, and most notably to enhance sexual ability. In Malay culture, a man's overall health is measured by his virility. Tongkat Ali (Eurycoma longifolia) and Ubi Jaga (Smilax myosotiflora) have been traditionally sought to increase overall energy, enhance sexual potency, boost metabolism and improve fertility. Ubi Jaga is believed to increase blood circulation, while Tongkat Ali has undergone many experimental trials. It has proven to promote sexual arousal and has been shown to increase testosterone levels.

See also
 Jamu

References

Traditional medicine
Malaysian culture